Ben Wilson (January 15, 1926 – October 2, 1970) was an American football player and coach.  He served as the head football coach at Wichita State University from 1969 until three games into the 1970 seasons when he was killed in a plane crash.

On October 2, 1970, Wilson and his wife, Helen, were killed along with 14 players on the team and several others during the Wichita State University football team plane crash en route to a game at Utah State University.  The remaining team members completed the season under assistant coach Bob Seaman.

Head coaching record

College

References

External links
 

1926 births
1970 deaths
People from Cadiz, Ohio
Coaches of American football from Ohio
Players of American football from Ohio
American football centers
American football linebackers
Heidelberg Student Princes football coaches
Heidelberg Student Princes football players
Virginia Cavaliers football coaches
Wichita State Shockers football coaches
High school football coaches in Ohio
Accidental deaths in Colorado
Victims of aviation accidents or incidents in 1970
Victims of aviation accidents or incidents in the United States